Ridge Career Center is on the northeast edge of Winter Haven, Florida. Its street address is 7700 State Road 544, Winter Haven, Florida 33881. However, it is actually a short distance south of Road 544 and it can be reached via Brenton Manor Avenue, where all entrances to the school are located.

History
This school got its start in 1974, when planning for it started. Construction began on the current site in 1977 and was finished in late 1978. The school opened in 1978 as the Ridge Vocational-Technical Center and the name later changed to the current name. Classes were held at various area locations while the campus was built. In January 1979 all school activities were moved to the completed campus.

Statistics
According to information from the U.S. Department of Education Institute of Education Sciences, National Center for Education Statistics, Ridge Career Center has 560 students, all vocational or undergraduate. The same source says the school has a 20 to 1 student to teacher ratio.  This source lists a graduation rate of 82%.

Faculty are listed as follows:
Total 84
Instructional and research personnel 49
Executives and administrators 4
Other professional personnel 4
Nonprofessional personnel 27

Career offerings
This school offers day, evening, short-term and online programs, according to its website. Specific offerings include:
Approximately 35 career programs in various business, medical, construction and other fields.
Apprenticeship program in automobile mechanics.
Short-term programs to provide training in computer software and upon the request of certain industries.
GED program.

Student assistance
Several items are available to assist the students, according to the Polk County Public Schools website.
The school has a library system.
Various financial aid programs are available for students.
A school advisory council operates at Ridge Career Center.

Accreditation
Accreditation for Ridge comes from various sources. The Commission of the Council on Occupational Education lists this school as accredited. Another agency accrediting the school is the Southern Association of Colleges and Schools Council on Accreditation and School Improvement. 
 The School Board of Polk County, Florida, on whose website Ridge is described, accredits this institution. Various individual programs are approved by agencies of the State of Florida and some programs are approved by various professional groups.

References

Vocational education
Technical schools
Buildings and structures in Winter Haven, Florida
Educational institutions established in 1978
Universities and colleges accredited by the Council on Occupational Education
Schools in Polk County, Florida